The 2022–23 HockeyAllsvenskan season is the 18th season that the second tier of Swedish ice hockey operated under that name. The series consists of 14 teams playing a regular season in which each team play each other team four times, twice at home and twice away. This is followed by a series of promotion and relegation tournaments, with the teams finishing first through tenth participating in promotion playoffs, and the teams finishing 13th and 14th forced to requalify to avoid relegation to the Hockeyettan. 

The 2022–23 would see four teams change in the Division, HV71 departing as reigning 2022 HockeyAllsvenskan champions and promoted to the SHL. Longtime SHL club, Djurgårdens IF suffering relegation from the top division, IF Troja-Ljungby returning to the HockeyEttan after only one season in the Allsvenskan and the inclusion of Östersunds IK after winning the 2022 HockeyEttan playoffs.

Participating teams

Regular season

Standings

Statistics

Scoring leaders

The following shows the top ten players who led the league in points, at the conclusion of matches played on 10 March 2023. If two or more skaters are tied (i.e. same number of points, goals and played games), all of the tied skaters are shown.

Leading goaltenders
The following shows the top five goaltenders who led the league in goals against average, provided that they have played at least 40% of their team's minutes, at the conclusion of matches played on 10 March 2023.

Post-season

Playoff bracket

Eighth-finals
Teams 7–10 from the regular season will play best-of-three playoff series, where team 7 face team 10 and team 8 face team 9. In each series the higher-seeded team have home-ice advantage, playing at home for game 1 (plus 3 if necessary) while the lower-seeded team play at home for game 2. The winners move on to the quarterfinals.

Almtuna IS vs. AIK

HC Vita Hästen vs. Västerås IK

Quarterfinals
Teams 1–6 from the regular season, along with the winners of the eighth-finals, will play best-of-seven series, with the winners moving on to the semifinals. The highest-seeded team chose whether to play the second-lowest seed or the lowest seed. In each series the higher-seeded team has home-ice advantage, playing at home for games 1 and 2 (plus 5 and 7 if necessary) while the lower-seeded team plays at home for games 3 and 4 (plus 6 if necessary) The higher-seeded half of the teams chose their opponents, with the highest-seeded remaining team choosing at each step.

Modo Hockey vs. AIK

IF Björklöven vs. Västerås IK

Mora IK vs. Södertälje SK

Djurgårdens IF vs. BIK Karlskoga

Semifinals
The winners of the quarterfinals play best-of-seven series, with the winners moving on to the Finals. The highest-seeded team chose whether to play the second-lowest seed or the lowest seed. In each series the higher-seeded team has home-ice advantage, playing at home for games 1 and 2 (plus 5 and 7 if necessary) while the lower-seeded team plays at home for games 3 and 4 (plus 6 if necessary).

Finals
The winners of the semifinals will play a best-of-seven series, with the winner being promoted to the Swedish Hockey League (SHL). The higher-seeded team has home-ice advantage, playing at home for games 1 and 2 (plus 5 and 7 if necessary) while the lower-seeded team play at home for games 3 and 4 (plus 6 if necessary).

Play Out
Teams 13 and 14 from the regular season will play a best-of-seven series, with the winner remaining in HockeyAllsvenskan and the loser being relegated to Hockeyettan. The higher-seeded team has home-ice advantage, playing at home for games 1 and 2 (plus 5 if necessary) while the lower-seeded team plays at home for game 3 (plus 4 if necessary).

Tingsryds AIF vs. Västerviks IK

References

External links 
Official site

Sweden
Allsvenskan
HockeyAllsvenskan seasons